The Château de Segonzac is a château in Segonzac, Dordogne, Nouvelle-Aquitaine, France.

Châteaux in Dordogne

Monuments historiques of Dordogne